Cressing is a village and civil parish in the Braintree district of Essex, England. Within the parish is the village of Tye Green and the hamlet of Hawbush Green.

It is nestled between Braintree and Witham, just a couple of miles or one train stop to Braintree Shopping Village, formerly Freeport.

The parish contains two churches, one public house (Fowlers Farm), one Restaurant (Il Salice), which is currently one of the top rated restaurants in Essex as of 2022, and a business park. A men's Sunday League and youth football teams play at Cressing Sports and Social Club in Tye Green. Cressing railway station, on the Braintree Branch Line, is at the west of the parish.

Sir Evelyn Wood (1838–1919), a Field Marshal and Victoria Cross recipient, was born at Cressing.

References

External links

Villages in Essex
Braintree District
Civil parishes in Essex